Nuzvid mandal is one of the 28 mandals in Eluru district of the Indian state of Andhra Pradesh. It is under the administration of Nuzvid revenue division, with headquarters at Nuzvid. The mandal is bounded by Reddigudem, Vissannapeta, Chatrai, Mylavaram Agiripalli, Bapulapadu and Musunuru mandals.

Administration 
The mandal is partially a part of the Andhra Pradesh Capital Region under the jurisdiction of APCRDA.

Settlements 

Nuzvid mandal consists of 25 villages. The following are the list of villages in the mandal:

Note:(M):Municipality

Sources:
Census India 2011 (sub districts)
 Revenue Department of AP

References

Mandals in Eluru district